The Hardwick and Woodbury Railroad (H&WRR, or H&W) was a short-line railroad serving the towns of Hardwick and Woodbury, Vermont. It connected with only one other railroad, the St. Johnsbury & Lake Champlain, in Hardwick.

The business arc of the Hardwick & Woodbury was typical of most short line, single-industry railroads. Built as an industrial road in 1895–1897, the line never grew beyond the granite industry, and its fortunes largely followed those of the Woodbury Granite Company, its principal customer and plurality shareholder.  With the slump in demand for architectural granite, and especially large stones, caused by changes in building construction techniques and then the Great Depression, the railroad ceased operations and abandoned its track in 1934.  The rails were removed in 1940, and little trace remains of the railroad today.

Background

The Green Mountains of Vermont have long been known for the quantity and quality of their granite and marble, but transportation problems, combined with difficulties in carving the hard stone (in the case of granite), largely prevented the development of a cut stone industry in northern Vermont until the middle of the 19th century, when some marble quarries were opened in the Hardwick area. The first "granite shed" was built in Hardwick in 1870.  Granite quarries were opened on Robeson Mountain (Vermont’s largest deposit of building granite) in nearby Woodbury in the 1870s, but transportation limitations prevented much development of the industry.

The construction of the Portland and Ogdensburg Railway (later the St. Johnsbury and Lake Champlain Railroad, or St.J.&L.C.) to Hardwick (in 1872) made it possible to ship northern Vermont stone in quantity to the outside world and facilitated the growth of the local granite industry.  Hardwick became a granite-cutting center, although it had limited granite of its own.  By 1890, there were a dozen sheds finishing granite in the town.  Rough-cut granite was brought from the quarries to and through the town in heavy horse-drawn wagons, which caused congestion and damaged roads and bridges.  In 1892, after pressure from both civic leaders and quarry owners, the railroad built a spur, the Hardwick Branch (also known as the Quarry Railroad), from Granite Junction (near the western edge of Hardwick village) to Buffalo Crossing, by the southern fringe of the village, which took granite wagons off the central village’s streets.  It also concentrated the granite industry, over time, along the Hardwick Branch, in five clumps: Lower Wolcott St., West End, Woodbury Granite Co., E.R. Fletcher Granite Co., and Buffalo Crossing.

Largely as a result of the World’s Columbian Exposition in 1893, granite became a very popular building material for commercial and government buildings. While the finer-grained granite of Barre was preferred for monuments and gravestones, the coarser-grained Woodbury stone found a market in "architectural" uses such as buildings and paving. As demand grew, the granite-finishing operations in Hardwick began to look farther afield for sources of the raw stone. While some quarries had been opened in nearby Woodbury, transportation of the stone to the finishing sheds was problematic: it was slow and difficult, and caused significant damage to the roads. The limitations of horse-drawn wagons would prevent much further growth in the local industry. Ordinarily, a horse was needed for every ton of granite hauled by wagon. Such a team might be followed by a one-horse wagon loaded with axes, shovels, peavies, and other tools to repair the damage. Transportation was somewhat easier in the winter, as the frozen ground would not give way, and snow allowed the use of sleds, which encountered less friction.

The incorporation of the Village of Hardwick in 1891 and the new government’s interest in improving the community’s infrastructure, including its streets, intensified the interest in an alternative means of transportation for the granite.  Meanwhile, the Village’s establishment of piped water, a fire department, and an electric department allowed for further growth of industry.  The opening of a rail link to the competing Barre quarries raised the spectre of the local industry’s being out-competed.  The St.J.&L.C. was asked to extend the Hardwick Branch to the quarries in Woodbury but, already in a weak financial condition and facing unfavorable economic conditions, declined.

Incorporation and construction

Faced with lack of interest from other quarters, the quarry owners decided to build their own railroad. The Hardwick and Woodbury Railroad Company was chartered ("for the purpose, and with the right, of building a railroad . . . from some point on the St. Johnsbury & Lake Champlain R.R. in the town of Hardwick to the mountain quarry of the Woodbury Granite Company in the town of Woodbury" ) by an act of the state legislature November 23, 1894, with the stipulation that construction must begin within two years, and be completed in five. The company’s charter permitted the railroad to cease operations from December through March, although this did not happen.
The larger local granite companies and many of their officers bought stock, as did a number of townspeople.  By 1902, the Fletcher Granite Co. owned one-third of the railroad’s stock.  The new company held its first regular meeting in March 1895.

As the St. Johnsbury & Lake Champlain Railroad had already built the  Hardwick Branch track to serve the granite sheds on the west side of Hardwick, construction of the new railroad began at the end of that spur, which was leased from the St.J.&L.C. for one dollar per year.  The St.J.&L.C. also provided 56-pound (per yard, or 27.8 kg/m) rails, spikes, and ties for the new company to begin construction of its main line.  The H&W rented some flat cars and a locomotive—a 4-4-0 Hinckley—from another regional railroad, the Boston & Maine, which was affiliated with the St.J.&L.C.  A wooden derrick and rail header (track-laying crane) were built on one of the rented flat cars (see photo).  This arrangement allowed two rails to be laid every nine minutes.

The route was surveyed in the summer of 1895.  As local labor was used as much as possible, the actual work of grading the roadbed was delayed until the haying season was over.  Much of the roadbed was cut from the sides of the hills, and grading was done with hand tools, wheelbarrows, and horse-drawn carts.  Five miles of roadbed were graded in 1895, and the remainder was graded in the summer of 1896.  Grading work came to a halt when the ground froze, and the first rails were laid thereafter.  Wooden trestles were built to span gorges along the right of way.  In a process that continued until 1904, the trestles were subsequently replaced with "grout" or waste stone, which was used to fill the ravines.  The fill was "fine" grout from the cutting sheds, as large blocks falling could have destroyed the trestle structures.  The largest—and last filled—of the gorges took 6,600 carloads of grout.
Varnum & Gilfillan, a St. Johnsbury-based contracting concern, was hired for culvert construction and trestle filling.  This company brought Italian immigrant labor from Boston, preferring this source to the less-reliable local farmers who often left to tend their farms.  These newcomers, who drank wine and beer, caused some consternation among the sober townspeople, but they did not cause much actual trouble.  A number of them stayed and worked in the granite finishing shops, becoming pillars of the community.

Five miles of new track was constructed to a point known as Burnham Hill in Woodbury by 1896.  By then, the rented B&M engine had reached the limit of its usefulness, and money ran short.  Work wound down until the new owners of the Woodbury Granite Company (John S. Holden and Charles W. Leonard) bought enough stock in the railroad to become its principal (although not majority) shareholders and a Lima Locomotive Works Shay, bought from the Barre & Chelsea Railroad, arrived in mid-1897.   The new locomotive was in poor condition, and required some re-working to get it serviceable.  It was given the number "1" and re-named "E. H. Blossom" in honor of the H&W’s General Manager.

The last few miles of track were difficult to build, as they ascended Robeson Mountain to the quarries through a series of switchbacks and tight turns, keeping the grade of the track at a maximum of 7%. The average grade of the last two miles was 5%.

Construction of the main line was completed to the Woodbury quarry around October 1, 1897.  The total cost of construction was reported to be $50,691.69.
Originally, there was no way to turn around a locomotive on the entire line: a crew would need to travel over the St.J.&L.C. track to Morrisville to use the turntable there. A wye was built at Foster’s Summit, and later another wye was installed near the H&W engine house in Hardwick. There were originally thirteen listed "stations" along the main line, but not a single company-owned building on the entire route. Despite the railroad’s name, the track did not extend to Woodbury village.

The directors of the railroad promised equal treatment of all local granite companies and free construction of siding tracks during 1897.  Soon, branches extended to the "Blue" and "White" quarries of the Woodbury Granite Company and the Fletcher quarry.  Woodbury’s "Gray" quarry atop Robeson Mountain was the end of the main line.  The larger quarries were served by multiple sidings; the Gray quarry had at least six, but these were removed and rebuilt as convenient to serve the quarrying areas.  At the other end of the line, in Hardwick, sidings extended to the granite sheds; no less than seven sidings served the Woodbury Granite Co.’s facilities.  The railroad’s "yard" comprised all of the track—main line and sidings—between Buffalo Crossing and Granite Junction.  The yard was sometimes called Woodbury Station.

The finished railroad had 43 curves with a maximum curve of 21 degrees.  Stub switches were used throughout.  The two main-line switchbacks were dubbed the Thomas and Fletcher switchbacks.  There were nine unprotected grade crossings of roads.  Although the State Railroad Commissioners were critical of the condition of the railroad, particularly its safety features, in their 1899 inspection report, it was allowed to operate because it was designed and intended to be a low-speed freight handler.
Despite official concerns, there were no train collisions on the railroad, and its injury and fatality record was better than the Vermont statewide average.  However, the railroad’s use of link-and-pin couplers meant that the brakemen had the most dangerous work on the railroad, and several were killed or injured.  The first operational fatality was in 1901 (another had occurred during construction).  In July 1904, three flatcars, loaded with grout, ran down the mountain, crashing into the engine house and wrecking Locomotive No. 2, a flatcar, and the engine house; this appeared to be the work of vandals who released the cars’ brakes.  Derailments were a frequent occurrence on quarry, mine, and timber railroads because of the light rails, sharp curves, and scanty ballasting often used in their construction; the H&W saw multiple derailments. Rerailer frogs, essentially ramps to get a derailed car’s wheels back on the track, were always carried on trains.

With the completion of the railroad, the quarries developed rapidly. Additional granite-finishing facilities were built around the Hardwick end of the railroad and the local granite industry became concentrated there.  Hardwick became an important granite center and its population mushroomed; town boosters proclaimed it to be the "building granite capital of the world."

Operations

As might be expected of a railroad built for an industrial purpose, the H&W’s business was dominated by freight.  Passenger revenue was less than 1% of freight revenue. In 1899, the railroad carried only 712 paying passengers; by 1906, this was down to 448, accounting for just $111 in revenue.  Freight, in turn, was dominated by granite: in 1898-99, granite accounted for 99.37% of the total freight transported.  Small amounts of lumber, merchandise, household goods, coal, and "miscellaneous items" accounted for the rest of the freight.  The freight tariff for ca. 1896-1899 was about 6 cents per ton-mile, so shipping cost only about 4% of the value of the stone: the quarry owners’ bet was a good one.

Built quickly and cheaply, and for heavy freight, the railroad was more expensive to run than many of its contemporaries, as the heavy cargo tended to overpower the light construction, notes Barnhill.  Frequent maintenance and repair work were needed; repairs and tie replacement accounted for about one-third of the railroad’s expenses.  Sagging or loose rails were a constant problem, and the track needed to be reballasted every year from 1903.  Locomotives were repaired by an engineer in the engine house in Hardwick, while car repairs were performed at the car repair shop at Buffalo Crossing.

Although the original directors of the railroad were largely aligned with the Fletcher quarrying interests, the later purchase of stock by the new owners of the Woodbury Granite Co. allowed them to take control of the company.  The board of directors was controlled by directors affiliated with the Woodbury company in 1902, with only two directors representing other quarrying interests.  By 1908, those two had left the board and the company was firmly in the control of the WGC.  The railroad’s growth was largely driven by the success and growth of the WGC, particularly once that company won the contract for the granite for the Pennsylvania State Capitol in 1903.  The 30-foot columns specified in the contract could not have been transported practically without a railroad.

The railroad company’s charter allowed it to suspend service in the winter, and the front page of the local freight tariff always included a notice that carriage was "subject to the right to suspend operations upon statutory notice" from December through March.  However, the railroad did not close for the winter throughout its operation although there were some shorter closures late in its existence.
As a result, snow was an issue for the railroad. The railroad's first snowplow was built by the railroad’s first engineer; it had to be removed and attached to the other end of the locomotive at each switchback.  Around 1900, this plow was replaced with a plow obtained from a timber railroad.  This proved unsatisfactory, and a second-hand plow was bought from the St. Johnsbury & Lake Champlain when that railroad obtained a new one.  This third plow served the H&W for the rest of its existence.  For lighter snowfalls, the railroad had a "flanger", designed by a conductor and built in Lyndonville.  It was built on a single long truck and was quite effective.

The railroad’s busiest years were 1906 through 1916, and its revenue peaked (at approximately $65,000) in 1913.  At the height of its operations, it had about 30 employees, including two train crews, one based at each end of the line.  As might be expected from a small workforce, the employees performed many duties that did not align with their positions on the payroll.
In 1916, the railroad was reported to have 3 steam locomotives, 54 freight cars, and one caboose.  Limited by the switchbacks, train length averaged ten to fifteen cars in the busy years; the largest train was reported to have been 22 cars long.  The largest single load carried was a 61-ton stone from the "White" quarry of the WGC.  The railroad’s earnings varied widely with the demand for granite, but on at least one occasion the profits were sufficient to justify paying a 6% dividend on common stock and 12% on preferred.

Railroad operations were of three varieties: main line hauling, quarry switching, and yard switching.  Main line hauling involved running trains up and down the mountain, bringing supplies up, and stone down.  Quarry switching was moving loaded and empty cars among the sidings at the quarries, and composing them into trains.  Yard switching involved moving cars to, from, and within the yard, and especially the finishing sheds, assembling trains, and exchanging cars with the St.J.&L.C. at Granite Junction.  The company had two train crews, a main line crew and a yard crew.  The main line crew performed the quarry switching as well as the runs up and down the mountain, and consisted of a conductor, engineer, fireman, and two brakemen (one at each end of the train).  This crew typically made two round trips a day between the quarries and Hardwick.

The locomotive was always placed at the downhill end of the train, where its braking power could be used to slow the whole train.  Flat cars had manual brakes, which would be set and released by the brakemen on orders from the engineer.  The Shay locomotives used considerable amounts of water, which could be replenished at three points along the route: the stream by Buffalo Crossing, a low spot between Burnham Hill and Foster Summit, and a tank at the quarries.

The yard area around Buffalo Crossing had such facilities as a coal pit, a car repair shop, a sawmill and electric power plant.  A coal trestle served both the power plant and the locomotives, which remained below the trestle on a loading siding, allowing their tenders to be loaded with coal from the coal cars above using gravity.  Locomotives were repaired in the engine house in the West End.  Other facilities included a track scale, which allowed car weights—and thus shipping charges—to be calculated.

Decline
The business arc of the Hardwick & Woodbury was typical of most short line, single-industry railroads.
The H&W was built to transport rough granite, and never had another industry of significance along its tracks. As a result, the railroad’s fortunes were inextricably tied to those of the granite industry, particularly its dominant local operator, the Woodbury Granite Company.  It is possible, notes Wood, that the decline of both companies began with the sudden death of George H. Bickford, treasurer of the railroad and secretary-treasurer (later general manager) of the granite company, in 1914.  During World War I, granite was a low priority, and new granite-working equipment was difficult or impossible to obtain, leaving companies to make do with old equipment.  A shift to concrete and steel-frame construction (which used granite only for façades) after the war led to a decline in the market for architectural granite.  As demand for the sole product slumped, so did the fortunes of the railroad.  Improved roads allowed for transportation by truck, and the smaller pieces of granite that were increasingly becoming the industry norm did not require railroads to move them.
The railroad suffered years of diminishing traffic and cutbacks.  The number of trains declined to one per week, and the workforce was cut until only three employees were left.

As the railroad slumped, the St. Johnsbury & Lake Champlain Railroad assumed responsibility for operations and the remaining employees in 1925.  The company was re-organized in 1926, with W.C. Clifford as its president.  By the next year, many repairs of equipment and track had taken place, and plans were made to replace some of the old cars.  In addition, the railroad made quarry owners responsible for the cost of maintenance of their sidings.  Also in 1927, the WGC was reorganized with the same president. However, the Great Flood of 1927 caused extensive track damage that November, disrupting traffic for more than a month.  Service was restored with a loan from the state to the parent railroad.  The years 1930–31 saw 11 local quarries go out of business.  Operation of the railroad by the St.J.&L.C. continued until abandonment of the line south of Buffalo Crossing was approved by the Interstate Commerce Commission in October 1934.  The abandonment was immediate, being completed on October 17.  The Woodbury Granite Company ceased operations the next year and sold its assets.

When the H&W stopped operating it owed the St.J.&L.C. a substantial debt.  The St.J.&L.C. resumed control of the spur that had been leased to the H&W, which remained in service as long as there was a need to ship granite by rail.  The rails south of Buffalo Crossing were removed in August 1940  No buyers could be found for the remaining locomotives, so they were scrapped, along with some 40 flat cars, the rails, and some other equipment.  Just one flat car was taken by the St.J.&L.C.  The proceeds from the scrapping were used to repay the St.J.&L.C. Company records were mostly discarded.

The last remaining portion of track, the spur built by the St. Johnsbury & Lake Champlain (and then known as the Hardwick and Woodbury Connecting Track), was formally abandoned in 2004 by the Lamoille Valley Railroad Company, successor to the St.J.&L.C., although it had not been used for some years.  The spur was railbanked, but is not included in the Lamoille Valley Rail Trail.

Rolling stock

Locomotives

The railroad’s first locomotive was the 4-4-0 Hinkley rod locomotive it leased from the Boston & Maine.  When this engine outlived its usefulness (largely because it could not ascend the steeper grades beyond Burnam Hill), the company bought a Shay locomotive (whose gear drive enabled it to handle steeper track) from the Barre & Chelsea.  This was given the number 1 and named E.H. Blossom for the railroad’s general manager.  It had two trucks and eight 32.5-inch (82.5 cm) drive wheels, and weighed 40 tons.  This locomotive was used for the rest of the construction of the line, and then was the railroad's only service locomotive for several years.

Locomotive No. 2, also a Shay, was purchased in February 1901; it was completed 1902 and named John S. Holden for the president of the railroad.  A larger and heavier machine than its predecessor, it enabled the railroad to run longer trains from the quarries to the finishing sheds.  It had three trucks with twelve 32-inch (81.3 cm) drive wheels and weighed 46 tons.  A third locomotive was purchased in 1906 and delivered in January 1909   It was first named Charles W. Leonard (vice-president of the railroad), then George H. Bickford (the railroad’s treasurer and son-in-law of John Holden), and finally Charles A. Hubbard (an engineer).  Larger than either of the others, with three trucks and twelve 36-inch (91.4 cm) drive wheels, engine No. 3 weighed 52 tons.  Although the railroad owned three locomotives from 1909 to 1917, it employed only two engineers and two firemen, so it is likely that Engine No. 1 was kept as a spare during that timespan.  A photograph of Locomotive No. 3 hauling a train loaded with stone was printed on contemporary postcards.

Cars and cabooses
The railroad bought 38 flatcars in 1904, after the Woodbury Granite Company secured its first large contract, for the Pennsylvania State Capitol.  By 1909, the line had rolling stock of about 50 cars, including flatcars, hopper cars, dump cars, a well car, a snowplow, a flanger, and three flat cars equipped with passenger benches.  It borrowed two passenger coaches for special outings.  In 1914, it was reported to have 57 flatcars alone.  
The 24-foot (7.3 m) long flatcars could carry , while the 36-foot (11 m) cars had a  capacity.  These cars, largely purchased from other railroads, weighed 10 to 15 tons each and had mechanical brakes, limiting their use to the H&W, as the federal Railroad Safety Appliance Act, which required such equipment as air brakes and automatic couplers after 1900, applied only to interstate commerce.  Larger flatcars (up to 80,000 pounds) and the well car, with air brakes and automatic couplers, could be used for interstate traffic and on other Vermont railroads.  Hopper or gondola cars were used to transport such small-sized materials as crushed stone, paving block, and coal.  Side-dumping grout cars were used to fill ravines and for dumping grout into piles; the dump mechanisms were operated with compressed air, eliminating the need for one crewman.

The railroad’s first caboose was known as a "bobber", as its two axles caused it to bob and sway on the uneven track. Other, larger cabooses followed.  The train crew had quarters in the caboose.  
Although some records indicate that the railroad owned two passenger coaches, these are believed to be inaccurate, as too few passengers were carried to justify owning multiple passenger cars, although coaches were rented or borrowed from the St.J.&L.C. for special excursions.  At other times, passenger benches were fitted on flatcars for fair-weather excursions.  Passengers were likely carried in the cabooses on most occasions.

The general manager of the Hardwick & Woodbury, Edward H. Blossom, designed a special car for shipping large granite blocks. The car had a 36-foot (11 m) platform and a  "cradle" or "well" in the center. On each long side of this opening ran three long timbers, one above the next, parallel to the long edge of the car. Each stack of timbers was held together—and to the platform of the car—by six vertical rods, which descended to eight inches (20 cm) above the heads of the rails. Each pair of these rods supported an oak bar, 4 × 6 inches (10 × 15 cm), running the width of the car (approximately 8 feet or 2.5 m). These six oak pieces were trussed together to form the floor of the well, which supported the granite slab on its edge, its upper part braced on each side by seven timbers (see photo), whose lower ends were fastened to the floor. On March 26, 1901, Blossom was granted U.S. patent No. 670,529 for this car, specifically its well bottom and adjustable support rods. The first finished stone shipped on this car was for a mausoleum in Chicago, and it seems likely that the car was designed with that sort of shipments in mind. This design was widely copied.

Legacy

The abandonment and removal of the railroad's track left a trail through the hillside pastures, which have reverted to woods.  A portion of the roadbed leading to the quarries is now Fletcher Quarry Road and Quarry Road in Woodbury, serving the one Robeson Mountain quarry still in operation.  Decades after the abandonment, some of the right-of-way, from near Buffalo Crossing to the Woodbury Town Forest, found a new use as the Hardwick-Woodbury Rail Trail (also known as the Hardwick-Woodbury Recreation Trail).

The postcard photograph of Locomotive No. 3 pulling a trainload of granite blocks saw continued life in other forms.  The picture became something of a "stock photo" in the 1920s and was reproduced—typically without attribution—far from Vermont.  This included such circumstances as stock certificates of, for example, the Virginia Alberene Corporation (see photo), which used a short-line industrial railroad to move blocks of soapstone.

A railroad modeler based a quarry railroad layout on the Hardwick & Woodbury. He particularly noted the railroad's use of "three Shays for motive power."  The E.H. Blossom well-deck car has also been modeled.

The small size of the railroad led to a number of jokes about it.  As early as 1902, W.H. Fullerton, a director of the H&W, contacted a counterpart at the New York Central Railroad to propose that they exchange free-travel passes on one another’s railroads.  Facing a rebuttal, he allowed that the Hardwick & Woodbury might not be as long as the mighty New York Central but, he maintained, it was "just as wide."  The story was re-told in the Woodbury and Hardwick area for decades.

References

Notes

Sources

1897 establishments in Vermont
1934 disestablishments in the United States
Vermont railroads
Railway companies established in 1897
Railway companies disestablished in 1934
Buildings and structures in Hardwick, Vermont
Buildings and structures in Woodbury, Vermont